The Henry J is an American automobile built by the Kaiser-Frazer Corporation and named after its chairman, Henry J. Kaiser. Production of six-cylinder models began in their Willow Run factory in Michigan on July 1950, and four-cylinder production started shortly after Labor Day, 1950. The official public introduction was on September 28, 1950. The car was marketed through 1954.

Development

The Henry J was the idea of Henry J. Kaiser, who sought to increase sales of his Kaiser automotive line by adding a car that could be built inexpensively and thus affordable for the average American in the same vein that Henry Ford produced the Model T. The goal was to attract "less affluent buyers who could only afford a used car" and the attempt became a pioneering American compact car.

To finance the project, the Kaiser-Frazer Corporation received a federal government loan in 1949. This financing specified various particulars of the vehicle. Kaiser-Frazer would commit to design a vehicle that in its base form retailed (including federal tax and retail delivery preparation charge) for no more than $1,300.00 (US$ in  dollars). It was to seat at least five adults, be capable of going at least  for sustained periods of time, and be available for retail sale no later than September 30, 1950.

A compact car design proposal was made by Howard "Dutch" Darrin that utilized the already approved future Kaiser, but with a shortened wheelbase. However, Henry J. Kaiser wanted an entirely new car and decided on a design developed by American Metal Products, "a supplier of frames and springs for car seats." In an attempt to improve the appearance of the car, Darrin contributed a "dip" to the beltline, windshield, and rear window as well as adding little tailfins.

To accomplish the low price objective, the Henry J was designed to carry the fewest possible components, and built from the fewest parts. To save body stamping costs, early Henry Js did not have rear trunk lids; owners had to access the trunk by folding down the rear seat. Another cost-saving measure was to offer the car only as a two-door sedan with fixed rear windows. Also lacking in the basic version were glove compartment, armrests, passenger-side inside sun visor and flow-through ventilation.

Power for the Henry J was delivered by a  four-cylinder  engine. Later models were available with a  L-head six-cylinder engine producing . The engines were supplied by Willys-Overland; the four-cylinder engine was the same engine used in the CJ-3A series Jeeps, with only slight modifications to component parts; the block and internal components were interchangeable with the CJ-3A engine. The Henry J production provided a substantial revenue source for Willys-Overland. This standard engine could achieve up to  when driven conservatively.

Before the Henry J was released to the market the first production models were taken to Arkansas for road testing. Experts computed that driving  on the roughest roads would equal  of normal driving.

Marketing 
While the Henry J was priced low, a Chevrolet 150 model could be bought for less than $200 more, and Chevy included operating rear windows and a trunk lid. The standard Chevrolet, Ford, Plymouth, and other low-priced competitors were also larger cars, offering more interior room. Kaiser-Frazer started offering the deck lid as part of an "Accessory Group" (preferred equipment group) during the 1951 model year, as well as a variety of other dress-up items. However, advertising for the Henry J still focused on operating costs at a time when the rationing of gasoline by the War Production Board ended and fuel sold for about 27 cents per gallon. The car could achieve  and in 1953, a Henry J won the Mobil Economy Run.

The Henry J proved to be a sales disappointment for Kaiser. Leftover 1951 models were modified with an outside continental tire and an upgraded interior, to be marketed as the 1952 Henry J "Vagabond" versions. Available in either four- or six-cylinder engines, a total of 7,017 were sold.

In 1952, Kaiser began selling rebadged Henry Js through Sears, under the nameplate of Allstate. Allstates were nearly identical to Henry Js but they carried a unique grille, hood ornament, hubcaps, identification badges and interior trim, and Allstate-brand tires and batteries. After two years of disappointing sales, Sears dropped the car.

The Henry J was also available in Japan from 1951 to 1954, through a licensing deal with East Japan Heavy-Industries, part of the Mitsubishi group.

In 1952, the Henry J Corsair (four-cylinder) and Corsair DeLuxe (six-cylinder) models were introduced featuring improved styling and workmanship, as well as higher prices. The front end had a full-width grille while the taillamps were incorporated into the rear fender fins.

The 1953 Henry J Corsair had few styling changes and featured the smaller L-head four-cylinder engine. Kaiser's advertising promoted it as "the easiest car on the road to drive, handle, park, service, run, maintain, and of course the easiest to pay for." A padded dash became standard.

For 1954, the four-cylinder Corsair price was reduced to $1,286 with the six-cylinder Corsair DeLuxe listed for $1,437, or $124 lower than the previous year. New safety features included padded dashboard and the windshield was mounted so it would pop-out on impact, as well as a "Penny-Minder" carburetor that was claimed to achieve .

Sales declined each year the car was marketed. In 1950 it had 1.35% of the market while in 1954 it achieved only 0.02%. While the Henry J was inexpensive for consumers, its manufacturing and labor costs were high. Henry J. Kaiser had hoped to make a profit through volume production; however, the cars' slow sales negated his plan. The automobile market was competitive and challenging the U.S. "Big Three" — General Motors, Ford, and Chrysler — proved difficult as price wars began that had a devastating impact on small domestic automakers.

Concurrently, sales of Nash's compact Rambler were successful, in part because Nash introduced it in 1950 as a high-value convertible-only model and marketed the small car with numerous standard features to avoid consumers seeing it as inferior or substandard. By 1953, it was reviewed in Kiplinger's Personal Finance as "well-equipped and stylish, the little Rambler is economical and easy to drive" in either convertible, station wagon, or hardtop (no "B-pillar") body styles." On the other hand, the Henry J was a plainly trimmed two-door sedan model; consumers understood the difference between "inexpensive" and "cheap" and they perceived the Henry J in a negative fashion. By September 1953, the Henry J was described in a small car comparison by Kiplinger's Personal Finance as "in trouble ... the closest thing to a "basic transportation" car on the road today, and as such, does not appeal to today's car buyers ... In trade-in value, it ranks among the lowest."

End of the car 
Kaiser's effort to boost sales in the low-priced market segment by adding a small car to its product offer came at a time when consumers were demanding big cars. With the acquisition of Willys-Overland's vehicle operations in early 1953 by the Kaiser Manufacturing Company division of Kaiser-Frazer (the division changed its name at that time to Willys Motors, Incorporated), management decided to discontinue the car at the end of the 1953 model year. Kaiser also leased the Willow Run factory to General Motors (because a fire had destroyed its automatic transmission plant in Livonia) and Kaiser's vehicle assembly was consolidated at Jeep's Toledo Complex. However, production of the Henry J was not moved from Michigan to the Ohio factory. Instead, the Willys Aero was a similar vehicle that continued to be made in Toledo. Efforts to sell off remaining vehicles resulted in an abbreviated run of Henry J automobiles as 1954 models that used up leftover or incomplete 1953 cars. They can be distinguished from the 1953 version only by their "54" prefix in the serial number.

Notes

References

External links

Kaiser Motors
Cars introduced in 1950
Henry J
1950s cars
Compact cars
Sedans
Rear-wheel-drive vehicles
Motor vehicle manufacturers based in Michigan